Benedita is a town and parish in the Portuguese municipality of Alcobaça. It received town status on May 16, 1984. Although a predominantly rural area, the parish of Benedita is heavily industrialised. Its main industries are the shoe making, leather, knife making, stonemasonry industries. Pig farming is also important economically for this parish. The town of Benedita is one of the main commerce centers in the municipality of Alcobaça.

Benedita is one of the 13 parishes that comprise Alcobaça municipality. It is located by south county and has a 30 km length.

Its history is long, beginning in 800 AD. Later, Monges de Cister, an organisation of Christians that are in Alcobaça, started to search for places to do agriculture and farming.

People of Benedita believe that there was a miracle with the Virgin Mary. The Virgin appeared to two sisters when they were getting water from a source, telling them to choose another location for the village church. 
Every time someone started the construction, the rocks disappeared. This happened so many times that people started to believe that the sisters were right and so the construction was not on the desired location and now these rocks are exposed in one of the schools at the village.

The population of the Benedita parish is of 8480 people, as of 2021.

References

Towns in Portugal
Alcobaça, Portugal